Three ships of the Royal Navy have been named HMS Brocklesby after the Brocklesby hunt:

 The first, commissioned in 1916, was an ex-coaster taken up from trade. She  served in World War I and was paid off in 1917.
 The second, launched in 1940, was a  destroyer that served in World War II.
 The third, launched in 1982, is a

Battle honours
 Dieppe 1942
 English Channel 1942–43
 Atlantic 1943
 Sicily 1943
 Salerno 1943
 Adriatic 1944
 Al Faw 2003

External links
 

Brocklesby